Atholl Henry McKinnon (20 August 1932 in Port Elizabeth, Cape Province – 2 December 1983 in Durban, Natal) was a South African cricketer who played in eight Tests from 1960 to 1966.

McKinnon attended Grey High School, a school famous for its sporting achievements.

A left-arm spinner, he toured England with the South African teams in 1960 and 1965, the only player to go on both tours. He represented Eastern Province in the Currie Cup from 1952–53 to 1962–63, and Transvaal from 1963–64 to 1968–69.

He later became a coach. He died of a heart attack in 1983 while managing the unofficial West Indian team in South Africa.

References

External links
 Atholl McKinnon at Cricket Archive
 Atholl McKinnon at Cricinfo

1932 births
1983 deaths
South Africa Test cricketers
South African cricketers
Cricketers from Port Elizabeth
Eastern Province cricketers
Gauteng cricketers
International Cavaliers cricketers
South African cricket coaches
Alumni of Grey High School